The Paisley Hurricanes are an amateur rugby league team. They play in the Scotland Division of the Rugby League Conference.  The club is currently based at the Anchor Recreation Grounds in Paisley, home of Paisley Rugby Union Club.

Fife vs Paisley game cancelled - points awarded to home side.

Previous Seasons 

2007
After the relative success of the previous season, the Hurricanes finished third in the Scottish Conference losing to the Edinburgh Eagles in the Semi-Final at Union Park, Costorphine

2006
The Hurricanes overcame much difficulty in their first season in the Scottish Conference, but managed to fulfil all their fixtures and finish in a respectable fifth place in their inaugural season. In the process they recorded wins against Glasgow Bulls, Easterhouse Panthers and Moray Eels

See also

Rugby league in Scotland
List of rugby league clubs in Britain

References

External links

Scottish rugby league teams
2006 establishments in Scotland
Rugby clubs established in 2006
Rugby League Conference teams